The Women's omnium at the 2012 UCI Track Cycling World Championships was held on April 6–7. 24 athletes participated in the contest.

Medalists

Results

Flying Lap
The race was held at 16:35.

Points Race
The race was held at 20:55.

Elimination Race
The race was held at 22:45.

Individual Pursuit
The race was held at 14:35.

Scratch Race
The race was held at 19:10.

500m Time Trial
The race was held at 19:50.

Standings
Final Results.

References

2012 UCI Track Cycling World Championships
UCI Track Cycling World Championships – Women's omnium